Võlli may refer to several places in Estonia:

Võlli, Pärnu County, village in Tori Parish, Pärnu County
Võlli, Viljandi County, village in Suure-Jaani Parish, Viljandi County